This is a list of television programs formerly and currently broadcast by the cable television channel E! in the United States.

Current programming

Reality/documentary 
Botched
Celebrity Beef
Celebrity Game Face
E! Investigates
 Mathis Family Matters 
Relatively Famous: Ranch Rules
Welcome Home Nikki Glaser?
Growing Up Chrisley (2022; moved from USA Network)
If We're Being Honest With Laverne Cox (2022)
Raising a F***ing Star (2022)
Nikki Bella Says I Do (2023)
E! News (1991–2020; November 14, 2022)

Movies 
Movies We Love

Acquired 
Las Vegas
Saved by the Bell
Sex and the City
Modern Family
Last Man Standing

Upcoming programming 
 Celebrity Prank Wars

Former programming

1990s 
 The Anthony Rodriguez Show

1990 
The Dick Tracy Show
Inside Word with Michael Castner
TV's Bloopers & Practical Jokes

1991 
One Day at a Time
Coming Attractions
E! Behind the Scenes
Talk Soup

1993 
Pure Soap

1994 
Howard Stern

1995 
Dear John
The Gossip Show
Night Stand with Dick Dietrick
Melrose Place

1997 
The Michael Essany Show
Wild On!

1998 
Celebrity Profile
Mysteries and Scandals
Boston March

1999 
Rachel Ashwell's Shabby Chic
Search Party

2000s

2001 
Revealed with Jules Asner

2002 
The Anna Nicole Show
Daly/Nightly
Star Dates

2003 
Celebrities Uncensored
It's Good to Be...
Love Chain
Totally Outrageous Behavior

2004 
Dr. 90210
Life is Great with Brooke Burke
Love Is in the Heir
Scream Play

 2005 G-SpotE! Hollywood Hold'emThe Entertainer starring Wayne NewtonFight for FameFilthy Rich: Cattle DriveThe Gastineau GirlsThe Girls Next DoorKill RealityParty @ The PalmsTaradise 2006 #1 Single7 Deadly Hollywood SinsChild Star ConfidentialThe Daily 10House of CartersLove RideThe Simple Life 2007 Boulevard of Broken DreamsChelsea LatelyKatie & PeterKeeping Up with the Kardashians Paradise CitySaturday Night LiveSnoop Dogg's Father HoodStarveillanceSunset TanTales from the HoffWildest Date Show Moments 2 2008 Denise Richards: It's ComplicatedKimora: Life in the Fab LaneLiving LohanParty Monsters CaboPam: Girl on the Loose!Pop Fiction 2009 Candy GirlsKendraLeave It to LamasReality Hell 2010s 

 2010 BridalplastyFashion PoliceThe Girls Next Door: The Bunny HouseHolly's WorldMarried to RockPretty WildThe Spin CrowdWhat's Eating You 2011 After LatelyThe Dance SceneDirty SoapIce Loves CocoKhloé & LamarKourtney and Kim Take New YorkScouted 2012 A-List ListingsLove You, Mean It with Whitney CummingsMarried to JonasMrs. Eastwood & CompanyOpening Act2013Burning LoveChasing The SaturdaysThe Drama QueenEric & Jessie: Game OnHello RossKourtney and Kim Take MiamiParty OnPlaying with FirePop InnovatorsThe Soup InvestigatesTotal DivasThe Wanted LifeWhat Would Ryan Lochte Do? 2014 Escape ClubThe FabulistGiuliana and BillHouse of DVFKourtney and Khloé Take The HamptonsRich Kids of Beverly HillsSecret Societies Of HollywoodUntold with Maria Menounos 2015 The Comment SectionChristina Milian Turned UpDash DollsGood WorkThe Grace Helbig ShowHollywood CycleHollywood Medium with Tyler HenryI Am CaitNew MoneyThe RoyalsSex with BrodyStewarts & HamiltonsWAGSWe Have IssuesWho Wore It Better 2016 Botched by NatureCatching KelceEJNYCFamously SingleHollywood & FootballJust JillianL.A. Clippers Dance SquadMariah's WorldRob & ChynaTotal BellasWAGS Miami 2017 The ArrangementDaily PopLife of KylieThe Platinum LifeRevenge Body with Khloé Kardashian  Second Wives ClubSo CosmoWhat Happens at The Abbey 2018 Ashlee+Evan Busy TonightCitizen RoseLadyGangModel SquadNightly PopVery CavallariWAGS Atlanta 2019 Dating #NoFilterE! True Hollywood StoryFlip It Like DisickIn the RoomRelatively Nat & Liv 2020s 
 2020 10 Things You Don't KnowCelebrity Call CenterThe Funny Dance ShowMeet the FrasersPop of the Morning 2021 Clash of the Cover BandsFor Real: The Story of Reality TVJason Biggs' Cash at Your DoorOverserved with Lisa VanderpumpReunion Road TripWe Got Love Teyana & Iman 2022 The Bradshaw Bunch''

References

External links 

E! original programming
E!